Oedipina gracilis is a species of salamander in the family Plethodontidae.
It is found in Costa Rica and Panama.
Its natural habitat is subtropical or tropical moist lowland forests.
It is threatened by habitat loss.

References

Oedipina
Taxonomy articles created by Polbot
Amphibians described in 1952